Spliff was a Neue Deutsche Welle (New German Wave) rock band, active in the 1980s. Three of the members were already playing together in the political rock cabaret Lokomotive Kreuzberg (founded 1972 in Berlin) before they were 'adopted' by Nina Hagen when she came to West Germany in 1977. They recorded two albums with her as the Nina Hagen Band before continuing under the name Spliff when Hagen went solo. Their characteristic sound was a mix of electronic music, reggae and punk rock. They recorded "The Spliff Radio Show" in 1980, their only album in English. After parting ways with vocalist Alf Klimek, the remaining members carried on in German sharing vocals between all four of them. Their album 85555 however was released in a limited English edition too. They had major hits on the German singles chart with "Carbonara", "Das Blech" and "Déjà vu". Despite their influential status, the band was short-lived.

Many of the musicians subsequently formed a band called Froon. The Other Ones was another offshoot band, which included Alf Klimek, who had appeared on the Spliff Radio Show as Alf Klimax.

Members
Herwig Mitteregger
Reinhold Heil
Manfred Praeker
Bernhard Potschka
Alf Klimek
Lisa Bialac

Albums
The Spliff Radio Show (1980)
85555 (1982)
Herzlichen Glückwunsch (1982)
Schwarz auf Weiss (1984)
Spliff Remix (1990)
Alles Gute (1993) ('The Best Of Spliff')

References

External links
Spliff discography from CD Universe
Europopmusic - Germany

German rock music groups
Neue Deutsche Welle groups